Ghanewadi Dam, is an earthfill dam on Kundlika river near Jalocala, Jalna district in the state of Maharashtra in India. This dam was built under sultan of Hyderabad Deccan Mir Osman Ali Khan - (the 7th nizam of Hyderabad) whose cinstrution was completed in the year 1935  and was the primary source of water for the city of "Jalna".

Specifications

Purpose
 Water Supply

See also
 Dams in Maharashtra
 List of reservoirs and dams in India

References

Dams in Jalna district
Dams completed in 1935
1935 establishments in India